Wu Qingfeng (born 28 January 2003) is a Chinese swimmer. She competed in the women's 4 × 100 metre freestyle relay event at the 2018 Asian Games, winning the silver medal. In 2019, she competed in the women's 50 metre freestyle at the 2019 World Aquatics Championships held in Gwangju, South Korea. She did not advance to compete in the semi-finals.

References

External links
 

2003 births
Living people
Chinese female freestyle swimmers
Place of birth missing (living people)
Asian Games medalists in swimming
Asian Games silver medalists for China
Asian Games bronze medalists for China
Swimmers at the 2018 Asian Games
Medalists at the 2018 Asian Games
Swimmers at the 2020 Summer Olympics